Fábio Ricardo Gomes Fonseca (born 18 August 1985), commonly known as Espinho, is a Portuguese professional footballer who plays for C.D. Feirense as a central midfielder.

Club career
Espinho was born in Espinho. A product of FC Porto's youth system he never appeared officially for its first team, spending two years with the reserves in the third division. In 2006, he signed with local S.C. Espinho in the same level.

On 8 June 2011, after two seasons in division two with Leixões SC, Espinho joined Moreirense FC. He scored nine goals in his first year to help the club return to the Primeira Liga after a seven-year absence, and, on 19 August 2012, celebrated his debut in the competition by netting his team's goal in a 1–1 away draw against F.C. Paços de Ferreira.

On 11 June 2013, Espinho signed a one-year deal with PFC Ludogorets Razgrad in the Bulgarian A Football Group, moving abroad for the first time at the age of 28. He appeared in 95 competitive games during his spell (seven goals), helping to back-to-back national championships.

Espinho left Ludogorets in June 2015, and signed a contract with Málaga CF as a free agent. He played only three matches for the Spaniards before returning to Moreirense on loan the following January, then joined fellow league team Boavista F.C. for one year in July.

Club statistics

References

External links

1985 births
Living people
People from Espinho, Portugal
Sportspeople from Aveiro District
Portuguese footballers
Association football midfielders
Primeira Liga players
Liga Portugal 2 players
Segunda Divisão players
FC Porto B players
S.C. Espinho players
Leixões S.C. players
Moreirense F.C. players
Boavista F.C. players
C.D. Feirense players
First Professional Football League (Bulgaria) players
PFC Ludogorets Razgrad players
La Liga players
Málaga CF players
Portuguese expatriate footballers
Expatriate footballers in Bulgaria
Expatriate footballers in Spain
Portuguese expatriate sportspeople in Bulgaria
Portuguese expatriate sportspeople in Spain